Francis Dodoo (born 13 April 1960) is a retired Ghanaian athlete who competed in the long jump and triple jump. He won a gold medal at the 1987 All-Africa Games and a silver medal at the 1992 African Championships, and his best placement in the Olympic Games was a 17th place from 1988.

He is currently a distinguished sociologist at Pennsylvania State University.

Achievements

References

External links

1960 births
Living people
Ghanaian male triple jumpers
Ghanaian male long jumpers
Athletes (track and field) at the 1984 Summer Olympics
Athletes (track and field) at the 1988 Summer Olympics
Athletes (track and field) at the 1992 Summer Olympics
Athletes (track and field) at the 1994 Commonwealth Games
Athletes (track and field) at the 1996 Summer Olympics
Olympic athletes of Ghana
Ghanaian sociologists
Ghanaian academics
African Games gold medalists for Ghana
African Games medalists in athletics (track and field)
Athletes (track and field) at the 1987 All-Africa Games
Commonwealth Games competitors for Ghana
Pennsylvania State University faculty